Barry Ward is an Irish actor. He began his career as a child actor on the RTÉ One and BBC One miniseries Family.

Early life and education
Barry Ward grew up in Blanchardstown, a northwestern suburb of Dublin.
He went to school at St. Declan's College in Cabra. He went on to study English and Philosophy at NUI Maynooth.

Career
He is an actor noted for his performances on stage and screen, most recently as the leading man in the Ken Loach historical drama Jimmy's Hall and his lead role in Luke Seomore and Joseph Bull's critically acclaimed Blood Cells.

Personal life
Ward lives in East London with his partner Laura Kavanagh, who works in film, and their son Tom.

Filmography

Film

Television

Music videos

Awards and nominations

References

External links
 

20th-century Irish male actors
21st-century Irish male actors
Alumni of Maynooth University
Male actors from Dublin (city)
Irish male film actors
Irish male television actors
Irish male stage actors
Living people
Date of birth missing (living people)
Year of birth missing (living people)
People educated at St. Declan's College, Dublin